Kevin K. Washburn (born 1967) is an American law professor, former dean of the University of New Mexico School of Law, and current Dean of the University of Iowa College of Law. He served in the administration of President Barack Obama as Assistant Secretary for Indian Affairs at the U.S. Department of the Interior from 2012 to 2016.  Washburn has also been a federal prosecutor, a trial attorney at the U.S. Department of Justice, and the General Counsel of the National Indian Gaming Commission. Washburn is a member of the Chickasaw Nation of Oklahoma, a federally-recognized Native American tribe.

Early life and education
Washburn was raised by his mother, Shirley Stark (née Wallace), in Oklahoma City and small towns in Oklahoma, including Purcell, Heavener and Ada. He  graduated from Moore High School, in Moore, Oklahoma, a suburb of Oklahoma City. Washburn came from an underprivileged background. Washburn discussed his childhood and mother in a speech given upon receiving the Spirit of Excellence Award from the American Bar Association. His mother, who was single for much of his childhood, raised him and his two siblings. She eventually retired as a community health representative for the Chickasaw Nation and currently serves on the tribe's Council of Elders. Washburn went to college at the University of Oklahoma, where he majored in economics and minored in philosophy. After graduating with honors, Washburn began law school at Washington University in St. Louis where he was the inaugural Gustavus A. Buder Scholar. After his first year of law school, Washburn transferred to the Yale Law School, where he served as editor-in-chief of the Yale Journal on Regulation and received his J.D. degree in 1993.

Career 
Washburn began his legal career by clerking for Judge William C. Canby Jr., of the U.S. Court of Appeals for the Ninth Circuit, a scholar in the field of Native American Law, former law professor, and author of American Indian Law in a Nutshell.

Washburn was hired through the Attorney General's Honors Program as a trial attorney at the United States Department of Justice Environment and Natural Resources Division. During his tenure there, Washburn successfully argued Montana v. EPA, in which the U.S. Court of Appeals for the Ninth Circuit upheld the decision of the Environmental Protection Agency to recognize the Salish and Kootenai Tribes as a state for purposes of setting water quality standards under the Clean Water Act. He also helped the Las Vegas Paiute Native American Tribe obtain water rights for a major development on the Snow Mountain Reservation, located northwest of Las Vegas, Nevada, and litigated water rights cases on behalf of the United States in Arizona and Montana.

From 1997–2000 Washburn served as an Assistant United States Attorney in New Mexico. Working in the Violent Crimes Section, he handled bank robberies, homicides, sexual assault and various other offenses, many of them arising in Native American country. His highest profile case was the successful prosecution of an offender who made threats against the United States District Court Judge John E. Conway and United States Magistrate Judge Robert DeGiacomo.

From 2000 to 2002, Washburn served as the third General Counsel of the National Indian Gaming Commission. He served during the time of a boom in the Native American gaming industry in California as that gaming became clearly legal due to the signing of tribal-state gaming compacts, a very active time at the Commission. As general counsel, Washburn made several reforms. First, on hearing complaints from the industry suggesting that agency staff were abusing power in the management contact review process by demanding changes to contracts that were not required by law, Washburn changed the review process by requiring staff to identify statutory or regulatory authority for any objection that agency staff made to a proposed management contract under review. Second, Washburn improved the Commission's enforcement efforts by working to make the Commission's document charging a regulatory violation, called a "notice of violation," more comprehensible to the public. Washburn required that such notices be written to explain the purpose for the rule which the target was accused of violating. The use of such "speaking indictments" clarified the reasons that the NIGC was taking action and therefore improved public understanding of the NIGC enforcement priorities. Washburn also aggressively defended the independence of the Commission as an independent regulatory agency, strongly resisting efforts by officials of the Department of the Interior to embroil the NIGC in the longstanding Cobell class action litigation that ultimately was settled as Cobell v. Salazar.

University of Minnesota Law School, 2002-2009
Washburn began his academic career as a professor in 2002 at the University of Minnesota Law School, where he earned tenure in 2006. He spent the academic year of 2007-08 as the Oneida Nation Distinguished Visiting Professor of Native American Law at Harvard Law School. In 2008, he joined the law faculty at the University of Arizona James E. Rogers College of Law, where he was the Rosenstiel Distinguished Professor of Law. Washburn has also taught short courses at the University of Montana School of Law and the University of Nebraska College of Law.

Much of Washburn's scholarship focuses on the intersection of federal Native American law and criminal law.  In one of his articles, he focuses on the federal criminal justice system that applies on Native American reservations and the federal constitutional values of criminal procedure. In another piece, Washburn writes about the federalized criminal justice system and federal Native American policy involving Native American self-determination. His groundbreaking work in this field was discussed at length in a piece in the High Country News. In July 2008, Senator Byron Dorgan introduced S. 3320: Tribal Law and Order Act of 2008 in an attempt to fix some of the problems identified in Washburn's scholarship. The Tribal Law and Order Act was signed into law in 2010.

Washburn is a scholar of the gaming industry and particularly Native American gaming. Washburn's scholarship includes articles addressing the regulatory process related to Native American gaming and the cultural clashes among federal agencies with regulatory roles in Native American gaming. Washburn is the author of a leading law school casebook] on the subject of the regulation of gaming and gambling. His work has been cited by the U.S. Courts of the Appeals for the Seventh Circuit and the Ninth Circuit, among other courts. Washburn has also testified frequently before Congress on issues related to gaming.

University of New Mexico School of Law, 2009-2012
In 2009, Washburn was named dean of the University of New Mexico School of Law and served for more than three years. In 2010, the School of Law celebrated the 60th anniversary of its first graduating class with a celebration attended by more than 800 people and the release of a book entitled "60 for 60: Shaping Law in New Mexico Since 1950" which documented the law school community's influence in New Mexico. The 60 for 60 event was reflective of Dean Washburn's efforts to connect the law school with the broader community. Washburn's tenure was marked by the successful recruitment of several high-value faculty members to the law school, in part, by raising all faculty salaries during a time of shrinking fiscal resources. These recruits included George Bach,  Yael Cannon, Max Minzner, Aliza Organick, Dawinder "Dave" Sidhu, Kevin Tu and Alex Ritchie. Washburn hired Ritchie to establish the law school's "oil & gas program", to provide more opportunity for communities and students from the San Juan and Permian Basin regions to engage better with the school. During Washburn's tenure, U.S. Supreme Court Justices Elena Kagan and Sonya Sotomayor visited the School of Law, and Ninth Circuit Judge Mary Murguia gave the inaugural Senator Dennis Chavez Memorial Lecture. The Chavez Lecture was established, during Washburn's deanship, through a gift from the Senator's family. Washburn helped to bring numerous other significant gifts to the law school to support students and faculty, such as the Daniels Diploma, the Salazar Prize, the Bailey Scholarship in Law, and the Hart Chair. Under Washburn's leadership, annual giving to the School of Law also increased dramatically. Washburn helped strengthen the relationship with the New Mexico courts, especially the Court of Appeals, which relocated to a new building next door to the School of Law during Washburn's deanship.

The UNM School of Law's curricular offerings expanded during Washburn's tenure. In addition to the oil & gas program, the School of Law developed a  semester in Washington D.C. program, spearheaded by then-Associate Dean Barbara Bergman, as well as an Innocence and Justice Project program designed to used DNA evidence to free the wrongfully convicted, funded by a significant grant from the U.S. Department of Justice obtained by then-Associate Dean April Land. Washburn also obtained a grant from then-Governor Bill Richardson to fund a DWI-DV Prosecution-in-Practice class in which students prosecute cases of domestic violence and driving while intoxicated.

Obama Administration, 2012-2016
Washburn left the UNM deanship in the fall of 2012, when President Obama appointed him to serve as Assistant Secretary for Indian Affairs at the U.S. Department of the Interior.  Following a confirmation hearing, he was confirmed unanimously by the United States Senate on September 21, 2012, and was sworn into office by Secretary of the Interior Ken Salazar on October 9, 2012. He served in that position until January 1, 2016, when he returned to the University of New Mexico as a faculty member. He was the twelfth Assistant Secretary of the Interior for Indian Affairs to be confirmed since the position was established by Congress in the late 1970s. He was preceded by Larry Echo Hawk and succeeded by Lawrence S. Roberts (acting). In addition to carrying out the Department's trust responsibilities regarding the management of tribal and individual Native American trust lands and assets, the Assistant Secretary is responsible for promoting the self-determination and economic self-sufficiency of the nation's 567 federally recognized Native American and Alaska Native tribes and their approximately two million enrolled members. As Assistant Secretary, Washburn helped organize the White House Tribal Nations Conferences for 2012, 2013, 2014, and 2015, in which President Obama invited leaders from each Native American tribe to Washington, D.C., to visit with the President directly and with his cabinet. Washburn also oversaw the establishment of the White House Council of Native American Affairs by President Obama.

Washburn's leadership at the Department of the Interior was marked by significant policy accomplishments, such as initiatives designed to preempt state taxation of business activity in Native American country to enhance tribal economic development, a reversal of the Department's rule against land in trust for Alaska tribes, more than half a million acres of new lands taken into trust for tribes, and more than 1.5 million acres of fractionated interests in existing trust lands restored to tribes.

Washburn also worked to reform and improve numerous BIA regulatory regimes, related to rights-of-way, Native American child welfare, the federal  acknowledgment process for Native American tribes, tribal jurisdiction, and Secretarial elections. Washburn described his philosophy at a lecture at UCLA in 2014.

Early in Washburn's tenure, Congress imposed a sequestration on the federal government, cutting five percent from each agency's budget. Nevertheless, under Washburn's leadership, Washburn worked with Congressional appropriators and the Office of Management and Budget to increase funding for the Indian Affairs programs at the U.S. Department of the Interior, resulting in an increase in appropriations from $2.3 billion in FY 2013 to $2.8 billion in FY FY 2016, a half-billion increase in less than four years, increasing the federal government's success in meeting its trust responsibilities to Native American nations. Moreover, the last budget on which he worked before leaving government services sought $2.9 billion in funding for these programs.

Washburn also helped the United States achieve settlement with Native American tribes in cases against the United States for breach of contracts and breach of trust, including a $940 million settlement in the Ramah Navajo Chapter class action and a $554 million settlement with the Navajo Nation.

Washburn's aggressive initiatives to advance Native American tribal nations was appreciated by tribal leaders for which Washburn received frequent praise, but his advocacy met a backlash among conservatives in Congress, producing an often contentious relationship with some members, particularly in the House. Washburn criticized House members for placing the legitimacy of some tribes in doubt and opposing the Obama administration's land-into-trust initiatives. Washburn also sometimes clashed with Senators, including Senator John McCain. During his tenure in office, Washburn was responsible, working with the Office of Federal Acknowledgement, for extending federal recognition to the Pamunkey Tribe of Virginia, the tribe of Pocahantas.

Washburn has attributed the successes on initiatives for Native American tribes during President Obama's second term to having an extraordinarily strong and hard-working political team in place in the Office of the Assistant Secretary, pursuing President Obama's Native American Country agenda, including the Principal Deputy Assistant Secretary Larry Roberts, Deputy Assistant Secretary Ann Marie Bledsoe Downes, Chiefs of Staff Sarah Walters and Sarah Harris, Rodina Cave, Cheryl Andrews Maltais, Kallie Hanley, Don Yu, Jonodev Chaudhuri, r Kathryn Isom Clause and Sequoyah Simermeyer. During Washburn's tenure, Morgan Rodman was named the first executive director of the  White House Council on Native American Affairs, which was chaired by Secretary of the Interior Sally Jewell, staffed by other members of the Cabinet, and housed within the Office of the Assistant Secretary.

Academia, 2016-present
In January 2016, Washburn returned to a faculty position at the University of New Mexico School of Law. Washburn's tenure as Assistant Secretary was more than three years and three months, making him the longest-serving official in that position since Ada Deer left the position in 1997, and one of the longest in the history of the position.

In March 2018, Washburn was named Dean of the University of Iowa College of Law.

In November 2020, Washburn was named a volunteer member of the Joe Biden presidential transition Agency Review Team to support transition efforts related to the United States Department of the Interior.

Personal life
Washburn is married to Libby Washburn. She currently serves as a special assistant to President Joe Biden on Native American affairs in the White House Domestic Policy Council. They have three children.

Gaming law
Washburn is one of the country's leading experts on gaming and gambling law. He served as the general counsel of the National Indian Gaming Commission (NIGC) from January 2000 to July 2002. In addition, he is the author of a law school casebook on Gaming Law and Regulation published by Aspen Publishers in 2011, and several law review articles. He frequently testifies before Congress and the courts on issues involving Native American gaming. While visiting at Harvard Law School during the 2007-08 academic year, Professor Washburn taught the first course on Gaming/Gambling Law in that school's history.  In addition to Harvard, Professor Washburn has taught Gaming/Gambling Law at the  University of Minnesota Law School, the University of Arizona James E. Rogers College of Law, and the University of New Mexico School of Law.

Federal Native American law
Washburn is also an expert in federal Native American law. He has been an author of one of the principal casebooks on federal Native American  law, entitled American Indian Law: Native Nations and the Federal System. He is also an author/editor of Indian Law Stories, a book that provides the back stories of several key Native American law cases. In addition, he is an author and member of the executive board of editors of Felix Cohen's Handbook of Federal Indian Law, the leading treatise in the field of federal Native American law. In 2017, the Harvard Law Review published online Washburn's reflections on the future of federal Native American law and policy.

Affiliations 
Elected member of the American Law Institute since 2007; Board of Trustees of the Law School Admission Council from 2006-2009, 2012, and 2016 to the present; Author and Executive Editor of Felix Cohen's Handbook of Federal Indian Law since 2005; Member of the Criminal Law and Procedure Drafting Committee for the National Conference of Bar Examiners 2006-12 and 2016-2018; Yale Law School Fund Board of Directors 1998-2004; Board of Directors of the Conservation Lands Foundation 2017 - 2020. Member of the  ABA Accreditation Committee, 2017-2019. Enrolled member of the Chickasaw Nation of Oklahoma, a federally recognized Native American nation. Washburn won the American Bar Association Spirit of Excellence Award in 2015.  Washburn was inducted into the Chickasaw Hall of Fame in 2017.

See also
 Bureau of Indian Affairs
 University of New Mexico School of Law
 University of Iowa College of Law

References

External links 
 
 Promotional Video on the Chickasaw Nation featuring Kevin Washburn
 Documentary Beyond Standing Rock featuring an interview with Kevin Washburn
 Documentary Taming New Mexico featuring an interview with Kevin Washburn
 Washburn's Acceptance Speech for the ABA Spirit of Excellence Award in 2015
 Washburn's scholarly articles collected on the Social Science Research Network
Scholarly Articles
Indigenous Peoples Law and Policy Program

1967 births
20th-century Native Americans
21st-century Native Americans
American legal scholars
American people in gambling regulation
Chickasaw people
Harvard Law School faculty
Living people
Native American politicians
Scholars of Native American law
United States Bureau of Indian Affairs personnel
University of Arizona faculty
University of Iowa College of Law faculty
University of Oklahoma alumni
University of New Mexico faculty
Yale Law School alumni
Deans of law schools in the United States